Paddy O'Hara is a 1917 American silent adventure film directed by Walter Edwards and starring William Desmond, Mary McIvor and Robert McKim. The film's sets were designed by the art director Robert Brunton.

Cast
 William Desmond as Paddy O'Hara
 Mary McIvor as Lady Maryska
 Robert McKim as Count Carlos
 Joseph J. Dowling as Count Ivan of Darbaya 
 Walt Whitman as The Monk

References

Bibliography
 Robert B. Connelly. The Silents: Silent Feature Films, 1910-36, Volume 40, Issue 2. December Press, 1998.

External links
 

1917 films
1917 adventure films
American silent feature films
American adventure films
American black-and-white films
Triangle Film Corporation films
Films directed by Walter Edwards
1910s English-language films
1910s American films
Silent adventure films